William Trist Bailey (October 9, 1846, Torquay, Devon, England - February 21, 1910, New York City, United States)  was a land developer who founded the community of Bayswater near Far Rockaway, Queens, New York City. He purchased the land from the descendants of Richard Cornell in 1878, and turned Bayswater into a fashionable residential neighborhood. Streets in Bayswater which bear his name are Trist Place and Bailey Court.

Bailey is buried in the Maple Grove Cemetery in Kew Gardens, Queens, New York.

References 

1846 births
1910 deaths
English emigrants to the United States
Land owners and developers in Rockaway, Queens
People from Torquay
19th-century American businesspeople